Leviathan or The Matter, Forme and Power of a Commonwealth Ecclesiasticall and Civil, commonly referred to as Leviathan, is a book written by Thomas Hobbes (1588–1679) and published in 1651 (revised Latin edition 1668). Its name derives from the biblical Leviathan. The work concerns the structure of society and legitimate government, and is regarded as one of the earliest and most influential examples of social contract theory. Written during the English Civil War (1642–1651), it argues for a social contract and rule by an absolute sovereign. Hobbes wrote that civil war and the brute situation of a state of nature ("the war of all against all") could be avoided only by a strong, undivided government.

Content

Title
The title of Hobbes's treatise alludes to the Leviathan mentioned in the Book of Job. In contrast to the simply informative titles usually given to works of early modern political philosophy, such as John Locke's Two Treatises of Government or Hobbes's own earlier work The Elements of Law, Hobbes selected a more poetic name for this more provocative treatise.

Frontispiece
After lengthy discussion with Thomas Hobbes, the Parisian Abraham Bosse created the etching for the book's famous frontispiece in the  style which Bosse himself had refined. It is similar in organisation to the frontispiece of Hobbes' De Cive (1642), created by Jean Matheus. The frontispiece has two main elements, of which the upper part is by far the more striking.

In it, a giant crowned figure is seen emerging from the landscape, clutching a sword and a crosier, beneath a quote from the Book of Job—"" ("There is no power on earth to be compared to him. Job 41 . 24")—further linking the figure to the monster of the book. (Due to disagreements over the precise location of the chapters and verses when they were divided in the Late Middle Ages, the verse Hobbes quotes is usually given as Job 41:33 in modern Christian translations into English, Job 41:25 in the Masoretic text, Septuagint, and the Luther Bible; it is Job 41:24 in the Vulgate.) The torso and arms of the figure are composed of over three hundred persons, in the style of Giuseppe Arcimboldo; all are facing away from the viewer, with just the giant's head having visible facial features. (A manuscript of Leviathan created for Charles II in 1651 has notable differences – a different main head but significantly the body is also composed of many faces, all looking outwards from the body and with a range of expressions.)

The lower portion is a triptych, framed in a wooden border. The centre form contains the title on an ornate curtain. The two sides reflect the sword and crosier of the main figure – earthly power on the left and the powers of the church on the right. Each side element reflects the equivalent power – castle to church, crown to mitre, cannon to excommunication, weapons to logic, and the battlefield to the religious courts. The giant holds the symbols of both sides, reflecting the union of secular, and spiritual in the sovereign, but the construction of the torso also makes the figure the state.

Part I: Of Man
Hobbes begins his treatise on politics with an account of human nature. He presents an image of man as matter in motion, attempting to show through example how everything about humanity can be explained materialistically, that is, without recourse to an incorporeal, immaterial soul or a faculty for understanding ideas that are external to the human mind.

Hobbes proceeds by defining terms clearly and unsentimentally. Good and evil are nothing more than terms used to denote an individual's appetites and desires, while these appetites and desires are nothing more than the tendency to move toward or away from an object. Hope is nothing more than an appetite for a thing combined with an opinion that it can be had. He suggests that the dominant political theology of the time, Scholasticism, thrives on confused definitions of everyday words, such as incorporeal substance, which for Hobbes is a contradiction in terms.

According to Hobbes, not only is the concept of a  superfluous, but given the variability of human desires, there could be no such thing. Consequently, any political community that sought to provide the greatest good to its members would find itself driven by competing conceptions of that good with no way to decide among them. The result would be civil war.

This is the fear of violent death. A political community can be oriented around this fear.

Since there is no , the natural state of man is not to be found in a political community that pursues the greatest good. But to be outside of a political community is to be in an anarchic condition. Given human nature, the variability of human desires, and need for scarce resources to fulfill those desires, the state of nature, as Hobbes calls this anarchic condition, must be a war of all against all. Even when two men are not fighting, there is no guarantee that the other will not try to kill him for his property or just out of an aggrieved sense of honour, and so they must constantly be on guard against one another. It is even reasonable to preemptively attack one's neighbour.

It suggests a number of laws of nature, although Hobbes is quick to point out that they cannot properly speaking be called "laws", since there is no one to enforce them. The first thing that reason suggests is to seek peace, but that where peace cannot be had, to use all of the advantages of war. Hobbes is explicit that in the state of nature nothing can be considered just or unjust, and every man must be considered to have a right to all things. The second law of nature is that one ought to be willing to renounce one's right to all things where others are willing to do the same, to quit the state of nature, and to erect a commonwealth with the authority to command them in all things. Hobbes concludes Part One by articulating an additional seventeen laws of nature that make the performance of the first two possible and by explaining what it would mean for a sovereign to represent the people even when they disagree with the sovereign.

Part II: Of Commonwealth
The purpose of a commonwealth is given at the start of Part II: 

The commonwealth is instituted when all agree in the following manner: I authorise and give up my right of governing myself to this man, or to this assembly of men, on this condition; that thou give up, thy right to him, and authorise all his actions in like manner.

The sovereign has twelve principal rights:

 Because a successive covenant cannot override a prior one, the subjects cannot (lawfully) change the form of government.
 Because the covenant forming the commonwealth results from subjects giving to the sovereign the right to act for them, the sovereign cannot possibly breach the covenant; and therefore the subjects can never argue to be freed from the covenant because of the actions of the sovereign.
 The sovereign exists because the majority has consented to his rule; the minority have agreed to abide by this arrangement and must then assent to the sovereign's actions.
 Every subject is author of the acts of the sovereign: hence the sovereign cannot injure any of his subjects and cannot be accused of injustice.
 Following this, the sovereign cannot justly be put to death by the subjects.
 The purpose of the commonwealth is peace, and the sovereign has the right to do whatever he thinks necessary for the preserving of peace and security and prevention of discord. Therefore, the sovereign may judge what opinions and doctrines are averse, who shall be allowed to speak to multitudes, and who shall examine the doctrines of all books before they are published.
 To prescribe the rules of civil law and property.
 To be judge in all cases.
 To make war and peace as he sees fit and to command the army.
 To choose counsellors, ministers, magistrates and officers.
 To reward with riches and honour or to punish with corporal or pecuniary punishment or ignominy.
 To establish laws about honour and a scale of worth.

Hobbes explicitly rejects the idea of Separation of Powers. In item 6 Hobbes is explicitly in favour of censorship of the press and restrictions on the rights of free speech should they be considered desirable by the sovereign to promote order.

Types
There are three (monarchy, aristocracy and democracy):

And only three; since unlike Aristotle he does not sub-divide them into "good" and "deviant":

And monarchy is the best, on practical grounds:

Succession
The right of succession always lies with the sovereign. Democracies and aristocracies have easy succession; monarchy is harder:

Because in general people haven't thought carefully. However, the succession is definitely in the gift of the monarch:

But, it is not always obvious who the monarch has appointed:

However, the answer is:

And this means:

Note that (perhaps rather radically) this does not have to be any blood relative:

However, practically this means:

Religion
In Leviathan, Hobbes explicitly states that the sovereign has authority to assert power over matters of faith and doctrine and that if he does not do so, he invites discord. Hobbes presents his own religious theory but states that he would defer to the will of the sovereign (when that was re-established: again, Leviathan was written during the Civil War) as to whether his theory was acceptable. Hobbes' materialistic presuppositions also led him to hold a view which was considered highly controversial at the time. Hobbes rejected the idea of incorporeal substances and subsequently argued that even God himself was a corporeal substance. Although Hobbes never explicitly stated he was an atheist, many allude to the possibility that he was.

Taxation
Hobbes also touched upon the sovereign's ability to tax in Leviathan, although he is not as widely cited for his economic theories as he is for his political theories. Hobbes believed that equal justice includes the equal imposition of taxes. The equality of taxes doesn't depend on equality of wealth, but on the equality of the debt that every man owes to the commonwealth for his defence and the maintenance of the rule of law. Hobbes also championed public support for those unable to maintain themselves by labour, which would presumably be funded by taxation. He advocated public encouragement of works of Navigation etc. to usefully employ the poor who could work.

Part III: Of a Christian Commonwealth
In Part III Hobbes seeks to investigate the nature of a Christian commonwealth. This immediately raises the question of which scriptures we should trust, and why. If any person may claim supernatural revelation superior to the civil law, then there would be chaos, and Hobbes' fervent desire is to avoid this. Hobbes thus begins by establishing that we cannot infallibly know another's personal word to be divine revelation:

This is good, but if applied too fervently would lead to all the Bible being rejected. So, Hobbes says, we need a test: and the true test is established by examining the books of scripture, and is:

"Seeing therefore miracles now cease" means that only the books of the Bible can be trusted. Hobbes then discusses the various books which are accepted by various sects, and the "question much disputed between the diverse sects of Christian religion, from whence the Scriptures derive their authority". To Hobbes, "it is manifest that none can know they are God's word (though all true Christians believe it) but those to whom God Himself hath revealed it supernaturally". And therefore "The question truly stated is: by what authority they are made law?"

Unsurprisingly, Hobbes concludes that ultimately there is no way to determine this other than the civil power:

He discusses the Ten Commandments, and asks "who it was that gave to these written tables the obligatory force of laws. There is no doubt but they were made laws by God Himself: but because a law obliges not, nor is law to any but to them that acknowledge it to be the act of the sovereign, how could the people of Israel, that were forbidden to approach the mountain to hear what God said to Moses, be obliged to obedience to all those laws which Moses propounded to them?" and concludes, as before, that "making of the Scripture law, belonged to the civil sovereign."

Finally: "We are to consider now what office in the Church those persons have who, being civil sovereigns, have embraced also the Christian faith?" to which the answer is: "Christian kings are still the supreme pastors of their people, and have power to ordain what pastors they please, to teach the Church, that is, to teach the people committed to their charge."

There is an enormous amount of biblical scholarship in this third part. However, once Hobbes' initial argument is accepted (that no-one can know for sure anyone else's divine revelation) his conclusion (the religious power is subordinate to the civil) follows from his logic. The very extensive discussions of the chapter were probably necessary for its time. The need (as Hobbes saw it) for the civil sovereign to be supreme arose partly from the many sects that arose around the civil war, and to quash the Pope of Rome's challenge, to which Hobbes devotes an extensive section.

Part IV: Of the Kingdom of Darkness
Hobbes named Part IV of his book "Kingdom of Darkness". By this Hobbes does not mean Hell (he did not believe in Hell or Purgatory), but the darkness of ignorance as opposed to the light of true knowledge. Hobbes' interpretation is largely unorthodox and so sees much darkness in what he sees as the misinterpretation of Scripture.

 This considered, the kingdom of darkness... is nothing else but a confederacy of deceivers that, to obtain dominion over men in this present world, endeavour, by dark and erroneous doctrines, to extinguish in them the light...

Hobbes enumerates four causes of this darkness.

The first is by extinguishing the light of scripture through misinterpretation. Hobbes sees the main abuse as teaching that the kingdom of God can be found in the church, thus undermining the authority of the civil sovereign. Another general abuse of scripture, in his view, is the turning of consecration into conjuration, or silly ritual.

The second cause is the demonology of the heathen poets: in Hobbes's opinion, demons are nothing more than constructs of the brain. Hobbes then goes on to criticize what he sees as many of the practices of Catholicism: "Now for the worship of saints, and images, and relics, and other things at this day practiced in the Church of Rome, I say they are not allowed by the word of God".

The third is by mixing with the Scripture diverse relics of the religion, and much of the vain and erroneous philosophy of the Greeks, especially of Aristotle. Hobbes has little time for the various disputing sects of philosophers and objects to what people have taken "From Aristotle's civil philosophy, they have learned to call all manner of Commonwealths but the popular (such as was at that time the state of Athens), tyranny". At the end of this comes an interesting section (darkness is suppressing true knowledge as well as introducing falsehoods), which would appear to bear on the discoveries of Galileo Galilei. "Our own navigations make manifest, and all men learned in human sciences now acknowledge, there are antipodes" (i.e., the Earth is round) "...Nevertheless, men... have been punished for it by authority ecclesiastical. But what reason is there for it? Is it because such opinions are contrary to true religion? That cannot be, if they be true." However, Hobbes is quite happy for the truth to be suppressed if necessary: if "they tend to disorder in government, as countenancing rebellion or sedition? Then let them be silenced, and the teachers punished" – but only by the civil authority.

The fourth is by mingling with both these, false or uncertain traditions, and feigned or uncertain history.

Hobbes finishes by inquiring who benefits from the errors he diagnoses:

 Cicero maketh honourable mention of one of the Cassii, a severe judge amongst the Romans, for a custom he had in criminal causes, when the testimony of the witnesses was not sufficient, to ask the accusers, cui bono; that is to say, what profit, honour, or other contentment the accused obtained or expected by the fact. For amongst presumptions, there is none that so evidently declareth the author as doth the benefit of the action.

Hobbes concludes that the beneficiaries are the churches and churchmen.

See also
Behemoth by Thomas Hobbes
Classical republicanism
John Locke

Hobbes's moral and political philosophy

References

Further reading

Editions of Leviathan
 Leviathan. Revised Edition, eds. A.P. Martinich and Brian Battiste. Peterborough, ON: Broadview Press, 2010. . 
 Leviathan: Or the Matter, Forme, and Power of a Commonwealth Ecclesiasticall and Civill, ed. by Ian Shapiro (Yale University Press; 2010).
 Leviathan, Critical edition by Noel Malcolm in three volumes: 1. Editorial Introduction; 2 and 3. The English and Latin Texts, Oxford University Press, 2012 (Clarendon Edition of the Works of Thomas Hobbes).

Critical studies
 Bagby, Laurie M. Hobbes's Leviathan : Reader's Guide, New York: Continuum, 2007.
 Baumrin, Bernard Herbert (ed.) Hobbes's Leviathan – interpretation and criticism Belmont, CA: Wadsworth, 1969.
 Cranston, Maurice. "The Leviathan" History Today (Oct 1951) 1#10 pp. 17–21
 Harrison, Ross. Hobbes, Locke, and Confusion's Masterpiece: an Examination of Seventeenth-Century Political Philosophy. Cambridge University Press, 2003.
 Hood, Francis Campbell. The divine politics of Thomas Hobbes – an interpretation of Leviathan, Oxford: Clarendon Press, 1964.
 Johnston, David. The rhetoric of Leviathan – Thomas Hobbes and the politics of cultural transformation, Princeton, N.J.: Princeton University Press, 1986.
 Newey, Glen. Routledge Philosophy Guidebook to Hobbes and Leviathan, New York: Routledge, 2008.
 Rogers, Graham Alan John. Leviathan – contemporary responses to the political theory of Thomas Hobbes Bristol: Thoemmes Press, 1995.
 Schmitt, Carl. The Leviathan in the state theory of Thomas Hobbes – meaning and failure of a political symbol, Chicago: The University of Chicago Press, 2008 (earlier: Greenwood Press, 1996).
 Springborg, Patricia. The Cambridge Companion to Hobbes's Leviathan, Cambridge: Cambridge University Press, 2007.
 Windolph, Francis Lyman. Leviathan and natural law, Princeton NJ: Princeton University Press, 1951.
 Zagorin, Perez. Hobbes and the Law of Nature, Princeton: Princeton University Press, 2009.

External links

Reprint from the 1651 edition

Full text online at oregonstate.edu
A reduced version of Leviathan at earlymoderntexts.com
Scan of 1651 edition

Leviathan
1651 books
17th-century Latin books
Books about sovereignty
Books by Thomas Hobbes
Books critical of Christianity
Books in political philosophy
Ethics books
Oligarchy
Works about the theory of history